Japygianus is a genus of diplurans in the family Japygidae.

Species
 Japygianus wheeleri Silvestri, 1947

References

Diplura